Benjamin Robert Moody II (born January 22, 1981) is an American guitarist, songwriter and record producer. He is best known as co-founder, former guitarist and co-songwriter of rock band Evanescence from its inception in 1995 to his departure in October 2003 after the band's debut album, Fallen. After leaving Evanescence, Moody co-wrote and co-produced songs for Kelly Clarkson, Avril Lavigne, Anastacia, Lindsay Lohan, Bo Bice, Daughtry, and Celine Dion. Moody has been a member of the bands The Halo Method and We Are the Fallen, the latter of which he formed with ex-Evanescence guitarist John LeCompt and drummer Rocky Gray.

Career

Evanescence

Moody was born in Little Rock, Arkansas. He met Amy Lee in 1994 while at a youth camp and the two eventually became friends. They soon began playing music at local shops.  Within a few years, the pair began selling EPs at local shows, culminating in their discovery by Wind-up Records and the release of their major label debut album, Fallen, in 2003.  Moody abruptly left the band in October 2003 during their European tour, citing "creative differences".

In August 2010, Moody released a statement on his history with Lee and Evanescence, where he said that he was a different person at the time, his friendship with Lee had deteriorated, and they had conflicting opinions, personalities, and desires with the band. Moody apologized to Lee for comments he made to her in anger. He said he realized the band would end if he stayed and believes he made the right choice. He added, "Evanescence has progressed a great distance from the original sound, and made it clear that they intended to expand much further. Amy is very artistic and never has had a problem thinking outside of the box and defying expectations."

Solo career
Beginning in 2004, Moody began collaborating with a variety of artists, working in multiple disciplines. That year, he co-wrote the track "Nobody's Home" for Avril Lavigne's second album, Under My Skin, and wrote and recorded the track "The End Has Come" with Jason C. Miller and Jason "Gong" Jones for The Punisher soundtrack.  He then wrote with David Hodges, Kelly Clarkson, and others for Clarkson's second album, Breakaway, working on the songs "Because of You" and "Addicted".

In early 2005, Moody played lead guitar for the song "Forever in Our Hearts", the 'song for tsunami relief' made exclusively for iTunes.  He collaborated with singer Anastacia on the song "Everything Burns", which is featured on her album Pieces of a Dream and the Fantastic Four soundtrack.  Moody then assisted Lindsay Lohan on her album A Little More Personal (Raw) and worked with Bo Bice on the song "My World" (a cover from SR-71) for his debut album The Real Thing.

In April 2006, Moody began working on the debut album of Billings, Montana singer-songwriter Hana Pestle. He co-produced and co-wrote alongside Michael "Fish" Herring, and contributed vocals and instrumentals to the album.  He later produced the Godhead album The Shadow Line with Julian Beeston, and played a clown in their music video for the song "Push". He collaborated with David Hodges again on American Idol Chris Daughtry's debut album, Daughtry, for the song "What About Now".

In 2007, Moody worked with Céline Dion on her album Taking Chances, and began work for his own solo album.

In December 2008, he released the Mutiny Bootleg E.P. and announced that his solo album would be released on March 3, 2009. This release would be delayed, however, as was hinted at in February 2009, when Moody's official website displayed the release as "available 2009" instead of the March 3 release date. On June 9, 2009, Moody's debut solo album, entitled All for This, was released digitally via Amazon.com, iTunes, and Amie Street through Moody's label, FNR Records.
His second album, You Can't Regret What You Don't Remember, was released on November 11, 2011.

We Are the Fallen

Shortly after the release of All for This, it was announced that Moody had formed the rock band called We Are the Fallen, of which he is still a member. The members of the band include American Idol 7 finalist Carly Smithson as the lead singer, former Evanescence drummer Rocky Gray and guitarist John LeCompt, and Moody's friend Marty O'Brien. We Are the Fallen made their first public appearance together for a press conference at SIR Studios in Los Angeles, CA, on June 22, 2009. Their debut album, Tear The World Down was released in May 2010. The band toured for most of the year in support of the album, and filmed their first live DVD, Cirque Des Damnés, at the Avalon Theatre. The DVD was scheduled for release in late 2011.

The Halo Method
In 2012 Moody teamed up with former Papa Roach drummer Dave Buckner, and former Rock Star Supernova frontman Lukas Rossi, to form a new project called The Halo Method. Before their debut show on the Shiprocked cruise in November 2012, former In This Moment bassist and studio engineer Josh Newell became their bassist.

Personal life
Moody was diagnosed with bipolar disorder in 2005. He struggled with substance abuse during his time in Evanescence, and entered rehab after leaving the band.

As of June 2022, Moody is now divorced.

Acting roles
Aside from his music endeavors, Moody works with his television and film production company, Makeshift Films.  He has also done some film work, such as his cameo as a zombie in Resident Evil: Apocalypse. He can also be seen in the 2007 release of the low-budget film Dead and Gone.

Discography

Evanescence

 Fallen (2003)

Solo
 "Everything Burns" (2005) - Single/Music video
 Mutiny Bootleg E.P. (2008)
 All for This (2009)
 You Can't Regret What You Don't Remember (2011)

We Are the Fallen
 Tear the World Down (2010)
 TBA (2023)

Other appearances

References

External links

BenMoody.com - Official website

1981 births
Living people
American heavy metal guitarists
American heavy metal singers
American male guitarists
American male singer-songwriters
American rock songwriters
Evanescence members
Grammy Award winners
Guitarists from Arkansas
Musicians from Little Rock, Arkansas
People with bipolar disorder
We Are the Fallen members
Writers from Little Rock, Arkansas
21st-century American singers
Singer-songwriters from Arkansas